İstanbul Teknik Üniversitesi B.K. (English: Istanbul Technical University Basketball Club), commonly abbreviated as İTÜ BK or simply İTÜ, is a Turkish professional basketball club that is based in Istanbul, Turkey. It is one of the most successful clubs in the history of the Turkish Basketball League, having won the league championship five times. Their home arena is the ITU Ayazaga Sports Center in Istanbul Technical University's Maslak campus.

Some of the well-known players that have played with the club over the years are İbrahim Kutluay, Harun Erdenay and Hüseyin Alp.

History 
The ITÜ basketball team was founded by former president of the Istanbul Technical University İlhami Civaoğlu and ITU graduate Nami Sukal in 1953. The team participated at the first Turkish Basketball League in the 1966–67 season. The golden era of the club was between 1967 and 1973. During this period, the team won 5 out of 6 national championships. After 1973, İTÜ gradually declined and relegated to the second league for the first time in the 1977–78 season. The team played first-tier basketball between 1979 and 1994, 1996–1998, 1999–2000 and 2001–2006. They were known as "Raks İTÜ" in 1996–97 and "Aras İTÜ" in the 2003–04 season. In the 2010–11 season, İTÜ once again was relegated to the third-tier but returned to the second league in the 2012–13 season. However, the club faced two successive relegations between 2014 and 2016 and ended up in the Regional Basketball League.

Honours
Turkish League
 Winners (5): 1968, 1970, 1971, 1972, 1973
Turkish Cup
 Winners (2): 1969, 1971

Players

Current roster

Notable players

See also 
 Istanbul Technical University

References

External links 
 ITU Sports, official website
 TBLStat.net Team Profile

Istanbul Technical University
Basketball teams established in 1953
Basketball teams in Turkey
Sport in Istanbul
Student sport in Turkey